Nasir Kandi (also Romanized as Naşīr Kandī; also known as Nāsirkand) is a village in Zarrineh Rud-e Shomali Rural District, in the Central District of Miandoab County, West Azerbaijan Province, Iran. At the 2006 census, its population was 1,878, in 413 families.

References 

Populated places in Miandoab County